The Men's sprint event of the Biathlon World Championships 2016 was held on 5 March 2016 at 11:30 local time.

Results

References

Men's sprint